Hegykő is a village in Győr-Moson-Sopron county, Hungary.

Notable people 
Beatrix, Countess of Schönburg-Glauchau (1930–2021), born in Hegykő

External links 
Official homepage
Hegykő at funiq.hu

Populated places in Győr-Moson-Sopron County